Sparky is a common nickname for people and animals. In the British Commonwealth, it can also be used to refer to an electrician.

People
Sparky Adams (1894–1989), American Major League Baseball player
Sparky Anderson (1934–2010), American Major League Baseball manager
Sparky McEwen (born 1968), American football player
H. F. Gierke III (born 1943),  North Dakota Supreme Court justice
Mark Hughes (born 1963), former Welsh international football player and manager
Eddie Lake (1916–1995), American Major League Baseball player
Shelly Liddelow (born 1984), Australian field hockey player
Sparky Lyle (born 1944), American Major League Baseball pitcher
Sparky Marcus (born Marcus Issoglio in 1967), American child actor
Mark Matejka, American Southern rock guitarist
Marv Olson (1907–1998), American Major League Baseball player
Mark Phillips, vocalist of the British band Demented Are Go
Charles M. Schulz (1922–2000), American cartoonist, creator of the Peanuts comic strip
Ronald Speirs (1920–2007), United States Army officer
Wilbur Stalcup (1910–1972), American college basketball coach
Melville Vail (1906–1983), Canadian hockey player
Sparky Woods (born 1953), American football college football player and coach

Fictional characters
Sparky the Fire Dog, official mascot of the National Fire Protection Association
Sparky, Richie's Pikachu in the Pokémon anime
Sparky, one of the nicknames given to Rygel XVI by John Crichton in the science fiction television series Farscape
Sparky, a gay dog on the animated television series South Park
Sparky, nickname for radio operator Sgt. Pryor on the television series M*A*S*H
Sparky, mechanic in the animated television series Speed Racer
Sparky, a firefly in the 1970s children's show The Bugaloos
Sparky, a mechanic in the adventure game Flight of the Amazon Queen
Sparky, an enemy type encountered in Super Mario World
Sparky the Wonder Penguin, character from the comic strip This Modern World
Sparky, nickname for Clark Wilhelm Griswold, Jr. in the National Lampoon's Vacation movies
Sparky, protagonist of the children's audio story Sparky's Magic Piano
Sparky (Atomic Betty), an alien starship pilot on the animated television series Atomic Betty
Sparky, the dog in the 1984 Tim Burton short film Frankenweenie and its 2012 feature-length stop-motion remake
Sparky (Lilo & Stitch), an alien experiment from the Lilo & Stitch franchise, also known as Experiment 221
Sparky, super hero from the cartoon Static Shock
Sparky (The Fairly OddParents), a fairy dog featured in season 9 of The Fairly OddParents
Sparky, the electric siege machine as a legendary card found in the real-time strategy Clash Royale
Sparky, a translated version of a nickname for Mikoto Misaka
Sparky (Marvel Comics), a synthezoid dog in Marvel Comics

Other uses
 Sparky, nickname of a robot dog on MythBusters
 Sparky the Sun Devil, Arizona State University mascot
 Sparky the Eagle, Liberty University's team mascot
 Sparky (comic), British comic book
 "Sparky", a song from Images (Brotherhood of Man album) (1977)
 "Dog-Like Sparky", a song from Sing to God (1996)
 Sparky, a performing sea lion at the Como Zoo

See also
Old Sparky, nickname for the electric chair in several U.S. states
 Sparkie (disambiguation)

Lists of people by nickname